Miss Ecuador 2018, the 68th edition of the Miss Ecuador pageant. The Gala Finale was held on 5 May 2018. The winner will represent Ecuador in Miss Universe 2018 pageant.

Results

Placements

Special awards

Best National Costume

Contestants

Notes

Returns

Last compete in:

2015
 Tungurahua
2016
 Azuay
 El Oro
 Pastaza

Withdrawals

 Chimborazo
 Cotopaxi
 Imbabura

Did not compete
 - Michelle Gabriella León López

Crossovers

Mayra Bravo participated in Miss Global Beauty Queen in 2016 and in Miss Mesoamerica International in 2017.
Valeria Guarnizo participated in Reina de Machala 2012, finalist in Miss Teen Ecuador 2012 and Virreina in Miss Teen Mesoamérica 2013.
Ximena Arroyo was Negra Linda de Esmeraldas 2013, Virreina in Miss Teen Ecuador 2013, Miss Turismo de Esmeraldas 2013 and Reina del Ecuador 2013.
Allison Matamoros was Miss Atlantic Ecuador 2013.
Mónica Fajardo was Reina of Lomas de Sargentillo in 2011 and Estrella del Carnaval del Guayas in 2015.
Blanca Arámbulo was Queen of the Ecuadorian Civic Committee in New Jersey in 2014.
Daniela Lüscher was Queen of Babahoyo in 2015.
Virginia Limongi was Queen of Portoviejo and Queen of the province of Manabí in 2012, participated in Miss World Ecuador 2014 winning and representing Ecuador in Miss World 2014, was selected as Top Model of the World Ecuador 2016 participating in the contest international where she figured as a semifinalist.
Heszen Johst was Virreina of Shell Mera in 2015.
Gabriela Jiménez was Señorita Simpatía at Reina de Quito 2016.
Abigaíl Soria was Señorita Patronato de Ambato in 2014.
Pouleth Hurtado was Reina de Píllaro in 2014.
Norma Tejada is originally from Machala, but she represented the Ecuadorian community in USA.
Blanca Arambulo is originally from Playas, but she represented the Ecuadorian community in USA.

References

External links
Official Miss Ecuador website

2018 beauty pageants
Beauty pageants in Ecuador
Miss Ecuador